National Route 376 is a national highway of Japan connecting Yamaguchi, Yamaguchi and Iwakuni, Yamaguchi in Japan, with a total length of 68.1 km (42.32 mi).

References

National highways in Japan
Roads in Yamaguchi Prefecture